Frédéric Lepied (born 1967) is a French computer engineer, and was the CTO of Mandriva until January 2006.

Biography 
Born in 1967, Frédéric Lepied took an early interest in computer science and was educated at the Bréguet school in Noisy-le-Grand, France. 

In 1999, he joined the Mandrakesoft Research and Development team.   He was known as the author of rpmlint, an RPM packages checker (similar to Debian's lintian program),  and the maintainer of several core packages, including XFree86 and the initscripts.   At that time he wrote an O'Reilly book on CVS (2000) and maintained the wacom tablet driver in XFree86 and in X.Org (2001).  He then spent one year in Canada in the Mandrakesoft Montreal office, and became Mandrakesoft CTO when he came back to France in 2002. 

Frédéric Lepied left Mandriva on February 3, 2006. He then joined Intel Corporation to manage Software manufacturers relationships. Late  2008, he joined Splitted Desktop Systems an innovative hardware company, as chief of strategy.   In 2013, he became VP Software Engineering at eNovance  before joining Red Hat in 2015.

References

Sources
 

1967 births
Living people
French computer scientists
Free software programmers
French computer programmers
French businesspeople
Mandriva Linux
Debian people
Intel people
Red Hat people
Red Hat employees
Emacs